Peter Hell (born 3 April 1947) is a German bobsledder. He competed in the two man and the four man events at the 1980 Winter Olympics.

References

1947 births
Living people
German male bobsledders
Olympic bobsledders of West Germany
Bobsledders at the 1980 Winter Olympics
Sportspeople from Munich
20th-century German people